Gilbert Ó Tigernaig was the Bishop of Annaghdown from 1306 to 1323.

Ó Tigernaig was a native of Carra, County Mayo, his family belonging to those ruling the area, subject to (or descended from) the Uí Fiachrach Muaidhe. The surname is now rendered as "Tierney".

Elected about 1306, Ó Tigernaig had been consecrated a bishop by 15 July 1308, taking control of the temporalities of Annaghdown on 15 July 1308. He also acted as a suffragan bishop in the dioceses of Winchester (1313), Worcester (1313–1314) and Hereford (1315). He died before 16 December 1322, in England, where he had been serving as suffragan in the Diocese of Coventry and Lichfield.

Further reading
 Gilbert Ó Tigernaig, Bishop of Annaghdown, c.1306–23, Michael Robson, Journal of the Galway Archaeological and Historical Society, 1996

References

External links
 http://www.ucc.ie/celt/published/T100005C/
 http://www.irishtimes.com/ancestor/surname/index.cfm?fuseaction=Go.&UserID=

Religious leaders from County Mayo
People from County Galway
14th-century Roman Catholic bishops in Ireland
Bishops of Annaghdown
Irish expatriates in England